State Route 206 (SR 206) is a primary state highway in the U.S. state of Virginia. Known as Dahlgren Road, the state highway runs  from SR 3 at Arnolds Corner east to SR 604 at the entrance to the Naval Surface Warfare Center Dahlgren Division in Dahlgren in eastern King George County.

Route description

SR 206 begins at an intersection with SR 3 (Kings Highway) at Arnolds Corner a short distance west of King George, the county seat of King George County. The state highway heads northeast along the height of land between Upper Machodoc Creek to the south and Pepper Mill Creek to the north. After passing through Weedonville, SR 206 leaves the short ridge and crosses Pepper Mill Creek to reach Berthaville, where the highway intersects SR 218 (Caledon Road). The two highways run concurrently east to Owens, where SR 218 turns south as Windsor Drive. SR 206 has an oblique intersection with U.S. Route 301 (James Madison Parkway) then crosses Williams Creek into Dahlgren. After passing through the center of the village, the state highway reaches its eastern terminus at its intersection with SR 604 (Twelfth Street). The roadway continues as unnumbered Dahlgren Road through the gate of the Naval Surface Warfare Center Dahlgren Division.

Major intersections

References

External links

Virginia Highways Project: VA 206

206
State Route 206